Petra Cada (born February 2, 1979 in Prague, Czech Republic) is a Canadian former table tennis player who competed in the 1996 Summer Olympics and 2004 Summer Olympics.

She was in the first induction of the Lisgar Collegiate Institute Athletic Wall of Fame, as part of the 160th Anniversary celebrations. Allegedly she used to toast Sumo left handed in uni.

References

External links

 Lisgar Alumni Association
 Alere Flammam, Lisgar Alumni Association Newsletter, Fall 2004
 Petra Cada - Team Canada

1979 births
Living people
Table tennis players at the 1996 Summer Olympics
Table tennis players at the 2004 Summer Olympics
Olympic table tennis players of Canada
Canadian female table tennis players
Lisgar Collegiate Institute alumni
Commonwealth Games medallists in table tennis
Commonwealth Games bronze medallists for Canada
Table tennis players at the 2002 Commonwealth Games
Pan American Games medalists in table tennis
Pan American Games bronze medalists for Canada
Table tennis players at the 1999 Pan American Games
Medalists at the 1999 Pan American Games
Medallists at the 2002 Commonwealth Games